George Herbert Wyman (1860 – 1939) was an American architect, best known for his involvement in construction of the Bradbury Building at 304 South Broadway in Los Angeles, California.

Life and career

Wyman was born in Dayton, the son of Ellen “Nellie” J. (née Rutledge) and Gustavus J. Wyman. On leaving school, he was apprenticed in the architects office of his uncle, Luthor Peters. He moved to Los Angeles in 1891 where he worked as a draughtsman in the offices of Sumner Hunt.

In 1892, Hunt was approached by the mining millionaire Lewis Bradbury to construct a landmark building for a site in downtown Los Angeles. Disappointed with Hunt's design, Bradbury took the surprising step of asking the young Wyman to design the building, despite the fact that Wyman had no formal qualifications as an architect, and had not previously designed a building. The reasons for this choice are still unclear, but it has been suggested that Bradbury was inspired by some sketches that Wyman had been working on.

Wyman had been toying with the design of a futuristic building described in Edward Bellamy's science fiction novel and social commentary, Looking Backward: From 2000-1887 (chapter 10). In the utopian society of the year 2000 the hero is taken to visit a commercial store:

With the exception of the fountain, the description neatly fits the interior which Wyman achieved in the Bradbury building just six years after Bellamy's book was published.

This narrative has been contested by John Crandell, who claims that the original story was unsubstantiated and relied on a single testimony from Wyman's daughters.

According to a story told by Wyman's grandson, the famous sci-fi figure Forrest J Ackerman, Wyman was troubled by the responsibility of taking on the commission. Both he and his wife Belle were Spiritualists, and the couple decided to consult the spirits for guidance. Using a planchette, a device similar to a Ouija board, they traced out the message
Mark Wyman take the Bradbury building and you will be... Successful.

Mark Wyman was George's younger brother, who had died at the age of 8. At first, they had trouble reading the final word, as it was written upside down in relation to the rest of the message.

As a result, Wyman accepted the commission, and Bradbury was pleased with the drawings and plans for a five-story building at the corner of Broadway and Third Street. The building was completed a year later in 1893 although costs spiralled from $175,000 to $500,000, largely as a result of Bradbury specifying the best quality materials for all aspects of the construction.

The Bradbury building was met with critical acclaim, including a positive review in Arts and Architecture magazine. However, it was Wyman's only major success. In the following years, Wyman received numerous commissions for new buildings. He decided to bolster his qualification with an architectural correspondence course, but this seems to have turned him away from using interior light as an architectural element. His office buildings took on a heavy solid style and most have subsequently been demolished, whilst the Bradbury building is still much celebrated. A particular question is why did Esther McCoy not consult a single primary source of information other than the allegation of Wyman's relatives, their claim that George had worked for Sumner Hunt. John Crandell's claim contradicting McCoy's whole thesis is thoroughly based upon primary source information circa 1890s. He has never come across a single piece of evidence that Wyman ever worked directly for Hunt prior to Hunt's election to retain Wyman's services as executive architect for the Byrne Building nine months following completion of the Bradbury. The continued claim of Wyman having been the design architect for the Bradbury Building is one of the most fatuous allegations in the history of Los Angeles.

Cultural influence 
Fittingly, given its original inspiration from 19th century science fiction, the building is perhaps best known for its appearance in Ridley Scott's science fiction film Blade Runner, where the decayed and dilapidated interior was used at the location for the home of the toymaker and android designer Sebastien. The building has since been restored, and the exterior is completely different from the sets used in the film, Homage to downtown: in search of place and memory in ancient L.A. - Sumner, Esther and George ~ The Bradbury, Reconsidered.

The Bradbury Building has also featured as a location in several other Hollywood films, including M (1951), Double Indemnity, Marlowe, D.O.A., Chinatown, The Perfect Sleep, Wolf, The Artist and Lethal Weapon 4 and TV shows like City of Angels and The Outer Limits.

References

External links
 Biography at Artnet
 USC description of the Bradbury building including photographs
 Chapter titled "The Bradbury, Reconsidered" within monograph titled Homage To Downtown ~ In Search of Place and Memory in Ancient L.A. John Crandell author. Ref. desk, LAPL history department.

19th-century American architects
1860 births
1939 deaths
Artists from Dayton, Ohio
Architects from Ohio
Architects from Los Angeles